Seevers is a surname of German origin. Notable people with the surname include:

E. E. Seevers (1862–1927), American politician
Greg Seevers (born 1965), American stock car racing driver
Paul Seevers (born 1969), Irish hurler 
William H. Seevers (1820–1895), American judge

See also
Sievers, German surname

References

Surnames of German origin